George Henry Prismall (born 10 March 1915, date of death unknown) was an Australian rules footballer who played with the Brunswick Football Club in the Victorian Football Association (VFA) competition, and with the Essendon Football Club in the Victorian Football League (VFL) competition.

Family
The son of Gladys Prismall, George Henry Prismall was born in Carlton, Victoria on 10 March 1915.

Football

Brunswick (VFA)
Recruited from the Silvan Football Club in the Yarra Valley Football Association, he played his first match for Brunswick, on the half-back flank, against Preston on 20 May 1933.

VFA suspension
Prismall was reported on a charge of having kicked Sandringham's Bruce Scharp during the third quarter of the 11 August 1934 match at the Brunswick Football Ground.

At the VFA Tribunal's hearing on 15 August 1934, the charge against Prismall was sustained, and he was disqualified for twelve matches.

Essendon (VFL)
On 12 June 1935, Prismall was granted a clearance "[from] Fitzroy and Brunswick to Essendon"; and, on 15 June 1935, he played his only First XVIII match for Essendon, against Fitzroy, at Windy Hill.

Military service
He served overseas with the British Merchant Navy during World War II.

Notes

References
 
  Maplestone, M., Flying Higher: History of the Essendon Football Club 1872–1996, Essendon Football Club, (Melbourne), 1996.

External links 
 
 
 George Prismal (sic), The VFA Project.

1915 births
Year of death missing
Australian rules footballers from Melbourne
Essendon Football Club players
Brunswick Football Club players
British Merchant Navy personnel of World War II
People from Carlton, Victoria
Military personnel from Melbourne